Victor Amos (born 5 March 1999) is a Nigerian football striker.

Career
Born in Abuja, he played with local academy UFC Asokoro Abuja back in Nigeria. He moved abroad during the end of 2018, when there was winter-break in most European championships, and, after a period of trials, he signed with Serbian top-league side FK Mladost Lučani. Despite being in the extended list of players registered for the league, due to his age, and the high competitiveness in the attacking sector of the first-team, he spent most of initial time playing for Mladost in the Serbian youth league. However, his talent and performances, along with circumstances at the time, made Mladost direction board make him debut for the first-team in an official match for the 2018–19 Serbian SuperLiga. It was on 24 November 2018, in a away defeat against Radnik Surdulica by 1–0.

References

1999 births
Living people
People from Abuja
Association football forwards
Nigerian footballers
FK Mladost Lučani players
FK Sloga Kraljevo players
Serbian SuperLiga players
Serbian First League players
Nigerian expatriate footballers
Expatriate footballers in Serbia
Nigerian expatriate sportspeople in Serbia